Thymosin beta-10 is a protein that in humans is encoded by the TMSB10 gene. TMSB10 is a member of the beta-thymosin family of peptides.

TMSB10 plays an important role in the organization of the cytoskeleton. Binds to and sequesters actin monomers (G actin) and therefore inhibits actin polymerization (By similarity).

References

Further reading